Oliver Rau (born 21 May 1968) is a German lightweight rower.

Rau was born in 1968. At the 1993 World Rowing Championships, he was part of the German lightweight men's eight that came fourth. At the 1994 World Rowing Championships, he won a bronze medal in the lightweight men's four. At the 1995 World Rowing Championships, the lightweight men's four again came third. At the 1996 World Rowing Championships, he won a bronze medal in the lightweight men's pair.

After his retirement from competitive rowing, he married fellow rower Jana Sorgers. The couple have twin daughters (born  2000) and for many years, they lived in Bremen. Oliver Rau worked for sports club SV Werder Bremen from 1996 until 2017.

References

1968 births
Living people
German male rowers
World Rowing Championships medalists for Germany